Faisal Khan (born 30 January 1999), is an Indian dancer and actor. He was the winner of reality shows including Jhalak Dikhhla Jaa 8, Dance India Dance Li'l Masters 2, Dance Ke Superkids and DID Dance Ka Tashan.

Personal life
Khan was born in 1999 and brought up in Mumbai, Maharashtra, India. His father was an auto rickshaw driver. Khan completed his tenth class studies at Meera Academy school in Ghatkopar, Mumbai. He learnt freestyle dance by dance teacher Shrikanth Ahire.

Career

Dancing
Khan began his career at the age of 15 as a dancer, he gave an audition in the second kids special season of Zee TV'S dance reality series Dance India Dance, where he was selected and came out as the winner with   prize money, and won a Favorite Shisya award at Zee Rishtey Awards. The show was judged by Geeta Kapoor, Marzi Pestonji, Terence Lewis. The series aired from April 2012 to August 2012.

After winning the series, he participated in another season of Dance India Dance title, Dance Ke Superkids. he was team-up with Raghav Juyal, Kruti Mahesh and Prince Gupta in the "Yahoo" team, which he won. The series was aired in September 2012 on Zee television.

Acting
Khan made his acting debut with Sony Entertainment Television's historical drama series Bharat Ka Veer Putra – Maharana Pratap, where he played the of younger version  of protagonist Maharana Pratap. His performance in this series, he received critical praise, and won two Best Child Actor – Male awards at Indian Television Academy Awards and Indian Telly Awards, and received several nominations.

In August 2014, Khan gave a special dance performance in the eighth season of Sony TV's game show Kaun Banega Crorepati, he performed there dressed up as Maharana Pratap on  grand premiere. In the same month, Khan appeared as a guest dance performer in the seventh season of Colors TV's celebrity dance reality series Jhalak Dikhhla Jaa, where he joined the contestant Mouni Roy and choreographer partner Punit Pathak, in special "Teen Ka Tadka" episode. Later in November 2014, Khan acted in Sony TV's crime thriller series C.I.D.. He portrayed an episodic role as the character of a dancer Faizal Khan, who is the prime suspect of a murder. In April 2015, Khan played the pivotal role in Sony Entertainment Television's courtroom drama series Bhanwar – Kalyug Ki Hairatangez Kahaniyaa. In June 2015, Khan gave a special dance performance on the finale episode of Colors TV's talent-based reality show India's Got Talent, he performed with the contestants X1X and Beat Breakers.

In August 2015, Khan participated in the eighth season of Colors TV's celebrity dance reality show Jhalak Dikhhla Jaa. He won and emerged as the youngest winner of the series, and received   prize money and a Mahendra SUV car, the show was judged by Shahid Kapoor, Malaika Arora Khan, Lauren Gottlieb and Ganesh Hegde. The series ran from July to October 2015. In January 2016, he participated in Fear Factor: Khatron Ke Khiladi 7. He teamed up with his choreographer Raghav Juyal and the host of DID Little Masters Jay Bhanushali. He got eliminated in February 2016.

In May 2019, he was cast to portray elder version of Chandragupta Maurya in Chandragupta Maurya replacing Kartikey Malviya whi portrayed younger version of the same.

Khan made his film debut with Marathi film Prem Kahani, he portrayed the role of a Rajasthani boy Baiju.

Since 2022, he is portraying Lord Garuda in Sony SAB's Dharm Yoddha Garud.

Filmography

Television

Films

Web series

Music videos

Awards and nominations

References

External links

(Season 7)
(Season 8)

Living people
Indian male dancers
Reality dancing competition winners
Indian television male child actors
21st-century Indian male child actors
Indian male television actors
1999 births
Male actors from Mumbai
Dancers from Maharashtra
Fear Factor: Khatron Ke Khiladi participants